Akdamar Island, also known as Aghtamar or Akhtamar, is the second largest of the four islands in Lake Van, in eastern Turkey. About 0.7 km² in size, it is situated approximately 3 km from the shoreline. At the western end of the island, a hard, grey, limestone cliff rises 80 m above the lake's level (1,912 m above sea level). The island declines to the east to a level site where a spring provides ample water.

It is home to the 10th century Armenian Holy Cross Cathedral, which was the seat of the Armenian Apostolic Catholicosate of Aghtamar from 1116 to 1895.

Etymology 

The origin and meaning of the island's name is unknown, but a folk etymology explanation exists, based on an old Armenian legend. According to the tale, an Armenian princess named Tamar lived on the island and was in love with a commoner. This boy would swim from the shore to the island each night, guided by a light she lit for him. Her father learned of the boy's visits. One night, as she waited for her lover to arrive, her father smashed her light, leaving the boy in the middle of the lake without a guide to indicate which direction to swim. He drowned and his body washed ashore and, as the legend concludes, it appeared as if the words "Akh, Tamar" (Oh, Tamar) were frozen on his lips. The legend was the inspiration for a well-known 1891 poem by Hovhannes Tumanyan.

The similar-sounding Akdamar (meaning "white vein" in Turkish) has since become the official name of the island.

History 

During his reign, King Gagik I Artsruni (r. 908-943/944) of the Armenian Kingdom of Vaspurakan chose the island as one of his residences. He founded a settlement and erected a large square palace richly decorated with frescoes, built a dock noted for its complex hydrotechnical engineering, laid out streets, gardens, and orchards, and planted trees and designed areas of recreation for himself and his court. The only surviving structure from that period is the Palatine Cathedral of the Holy Cross ( Surb Khach yekeġetsi). It was built of pink volcanic tuff by the architect-monk Manuel during the years 915-921, with an interior measuring 14.80m × 11.5m and the dome reaching 20.40m above ground. In later centuries, and until 1915, it formed part of a monastic complex, the ruins of which can still be seen to the south of the church.

Between 1116 and 1895 the island was the location of the Catholicosate of Aghtamar of the Armenian Apostolic Church.  Khachatur III, who died in 1895, was the last Catholicos of Aght'amar. In April 1915, during the Armenian genocide, the monks on Aght'amar were massacred, the cathedral looted, and the monastic buildings destroyed.

On August 28, 2010, a small solar energy power plant was opened on the island, to provide local installations with electricity.

Holy Cross Cathedral 

The architecture of the church is based on a form that had been developed in Armenia several centuries earlier; the best-known example being that of the seventh century St. Hripsime church in Echmiadzin, incorporating a dome with a conical roof.

The unique importance of the Cathedral Church of the Holy Cross comes from the extensive array of bas-relief carving of mostly biblical scenes that adorn its external walls. The meanings of these reliefs have been the subject of much and varied interpretation. Not all of this speculation has been produced in good faith - for example, Turkish sources illustrate Islamic and Turkic influences behind the content of some of the reliefs, such as the prominent depiction of a prince sitting cross-legged on a Turkic-style, low throne. Some scholars assert that the friezes parallel contemporary motifs found in Umayyad art - such as a turbaned prince, Arab styles of dress, wine imagery; allusions to royal Sassanian imagery are also present (griffins, for example).

Vandalism
After 1915, the church has been exposed to extensive vandalism. Before the restoration of the church, the reliefs on the church wall used as a shooting range. Zakarya Mildanoğlu, an architect who was involved in the restoration process of the church, explains the situation during an interview with Hrant Dink as "The facade of the church is full of bullet holes. Some of them are so big that they can not be covered during the renovation process." During many conferences related to the restoration of the Akhtamar church, the process of covering the bullet holes are identified as the hardest part of the restoration by academicians and architects. Some claim that the Armenian churches and gravestones have been exposed to vandalism as a part of the Turkish government policy which aims to destroy the Armenian heritage in Anatolia.

In 1951 an order was issued to demolish the church, but the writer Yasar Kemal managed to stop its destruction. He explained the situation to Alain Bosquet as "I was in a ship from Tatvan to Van. I met with a military officer Dr. Cavit Bey on board. I told him, in this city there is a church descended from Armenians. It is a masterpiece. These days, they are demolishing this church. I will take you there tomorrow. This church is a monument of Anatolia. Can you help me to stop the destruction? The next day we went there with the military officer.  They have already demolished the small chapel next to the church.  The military officer became angry and told the workers, "I am ordering you to stop working. I will meet with governor. There will be no movement until I return to the island again". The workers immediately stopped the demolition. We arrived at Van city center. I contacted the newspaper Cumhuriyet. They informed the Ministry of Education about the demolition. Two days later, Minister Avni Başman telegraphed the Van governor and ordered to stop the demolition permanently. June 25, 1951, the day when the order came, is the liberation day of the church."

Restoration

Between May 2005 and October 2006, the church underwent a controversial restoration program. The restoration had a stated budget of 2 million Turkish Lira (approximately 1.4 million USD) and was financed by the Turkish Ministry of Culture. It officially re-opened as a museum on 29 March 2007 in a ceremony attended by the Turkish Minister of Culture, government officials, ambassadors of several countries, Patriarch Mesrob II (spiritual leader of the Armenian Orthodox community of Turkey), a delegation from Armenia headed by the Deputy to the Armenian Minister of Culture, and a large group of invited journalists from many news organizations around the world.

Özdemir Çakacak, the Governor of Van, described the refurbishing of the church as "a show of Turkey's respect for history and culture". A Turkish state department museum official added, "We could not have ignored the artifacts of our Armenian citizens, and we did not."  Signs heralding the church reopening declared "Tarihe saygı, kültüre saygı" ("Respect the history, respect the culture").

According to Maximilian Hartmuth, an academician at Sabancı University,  "the church was turned into a museum rather than re-opened as a place of worship following the restoration was, for example, claimed to be a wedge separating the monument from Turkey’s Armenian community. The critics, writing for media such as Radikal, Milliyet, or Turkish Daily News, furthermore lamented that permission to re-mount the cross on top of the church was not given. Moreover, they argued, the official name of the museum, the Turkish Akdamar (translating as “white vein”) rather than the original Armenian Ahtamar – the name of the island in Lake Van on which the church stands and Surp Haç (Holy Cross) for the church itself would suggest this to be a Turkish monument. At the same time only sparing use was made of the word “Armenian” in official statements. With Turkey's Armenian community not granted the privilege to hold a service at least once a year - as had been requested - and a large Turkish flag flying over the island, it was suggested by some critics that this project really announced the “Turkification” of this monument, the initiative being no more than a media stunt."

Controversies
Armenian religious leaders invited to attend the opening ceremony opted to boycott the event, because the church was being reopened as a secular museum. Controversy surrounded the issue of whether the cross atop the dome until 1915 should be replaced. Some Armenians said that the renovation was unfinished until the cross was replaced, and that prayer should be allowed inside at least once a year. A cross had been prepared nearly a year before the opening, and Mesrob II petitioned the Prime Minister and Minister of Culture to place the cross on the dome of the cathedral. Turkish officials cited technical difficulties related to the structure of the restored building which may not be able to safely hold a heavy cross on top without further reinforcement.

The controversial cross was erected on the top of the church on October 2, 2010. The cross was sent by the Armenian Patriarchate of Istanbul to Van by plane. It is 2 meters high and weigh 110 kilograms. It was put on top of the church after being sanctified by Armenian clergymen. Since 2010, every year a mass is held in the church too.

The opening was controversial among some Turkish nationalist groups, who protested at the island and in a separate demonstration in Ankara. Police detained five Turkish nationals who carried a banner declaring "The Turkish people are noble. They would never commit genocide." Demonstrators outside the Ministry of the Interior in Ankara chanted slogans against the possibility of a cross being erected atop the church, declaring "You are all Armenians, we are all Turks and Muslims".

Hürriyet columnist Cengiz Çandar characterized the way the Turkish government handled the opening as an extension of an ongoing "cultural genocide" of the Armenians. He characterizes the renaming of the church from Armenian to Turkish as part of a broader program to rename Armenian historical sites in Turkey, and attributes the refusal to place a cross atop the church as symptomatic of religious intolerance in Turkish society. (This was written before the cross was placed at its place on top of the church in 2010)

Turkish deputy minister for culture, İsmet Yılmaz cited technical reasons for not being able to place a cross atop the dome of the church:

Although this explanation from the government met with doubts, after the cross was erected on the dome of the church in 2010 (which weighed 110 kg - about half of what the Turkish deputy minister spoke about), after 2011 Van earthquake cracks appeared around the dome of the church.

Çandar notes that the Agos issue published on the day of the murder of Hrant Dink featured a Dink commentary on the Turkish government's handling of the Akdamar issue, which the late journalist characterized as "A real comedy... A real tragedy..."  According to Dink,

Historian Ara Sarafian has answered some criticism of the Akdamar project, stating that, on the contrary, the project represents an answer to allegations of cultural genocide. He has stated that the revitalization of the site is "an important peace offering" from the Turkish government.

The Armenian delegation attending the opening, led by the Deputy Minister of Culture and Youth Affairs; Gagik Giurjyan, faced obstacles on their way to the opening. They had to travel 16 hours by bus through Georgia to Turkey, due to the closure of the Turkish-Armenian border by Turkey.

Ian Herbert, writing in The Independent, records his own experiences traveling in Turkey on an invitation from the Turkish government in the period of the opening of Akdamar:

Cengiz Aktar, an academic of Galatasaray University, also took a critical stance towards the loss of the island's original name in his article titled "White Vein church and others" (Akdamar means "white vein" in Turkish).

Not all the comments were negative of the restoration of the church by the Turkish government. British historian of Armenian descent, Ara Sarafian considered the opening of the church for service as "a positive step".

Gallery

See also 
Adır Island
Çarpanak Island
Kuş Island

Notes

Further reading 
Sirarpie Der Nersessian, Aght'amar, Church of the Holy Cross (Cambridge, Mass., 1964).
Sirarpie Der Nersessian and H. Vahramian, Documents of Armenian Architecture, Vol. 8: Aght'amar (Milan, 1974).
J. G. DavieMedieval Armenian Art and Architecture: The Church of the Holy Cross, Aght'amarmar (London, 1991).

Lynn Jones, Between Islam and Byzantium: Aght'amar and the Visual Construction of Medieval Armenian Rulership (Aldershot, Ashgate, 2007).

External links 

 Armenian Religious Service in Turkey: Breaking a Taboo in Akdamar
 Information about Akdamar Island from Sacred Sites, Places of Peace and Power
 The Surp Hach (Saint Cross) church on Akhtamar Island
 A detailed study of the reliefs on the east facade of the Holy Cross church on Aghtamar island
  The 1973 pre-restoration photographic survey of the Cathedral of the Holy Cross at Akdamar Island  
 Observations and comments on the 2005-2006 restoration of the church
 UNESCO

Islands of Lake Van
Islands of Van Province
Islands of Turkey
Eastern Anatolia Region
Armenian Highlands
Oriental Orthodox congregations established in the 10th century
Gevaş District